Nicholas John Hancock (born 25 October 1962) is an English actor and television presenter. He hosted the sports quiz They Think It's All Over for 10 years. He also formerly presented Room 101 (1994–1999) on TV, as well as its earlier radio version (1992–1994).

Early life
Hancock grew up with three elder sisters and his father Ken. He was educated at Yarlet School in Staffordshire and later Shrewsbury School. He was awarded a third-class degree in education by Homerton College, Cambridge. While he was at Cambridge Hancock was a member of the Footlights, where he first collaborated with Hugh Dennis and Steve Punt, and became president in 1983, with Punt as vice president. He was also a founding member of the Homerton College Blaggards.

After graduating Hancock became a PE teacher and practised stand-up comedy as a hobby. He formed a double act with Neil Mullarkey, another former member of the Footlights, and they mostly did satirical spoofs of the title sequences of television shows to accompanying music, several times on television, including on After Ten with Tarbuck in 1988. The shows included Doctor Who, Kojak, and Dad's Army. One of Hancock's earliest TV breaks was presenting La Triviatta, a comedy/chat show about trivia for the short-lived station British Satellite Broadcasting.

Hancock appeared in an advertisement for Datapost in 1988, and in a series of advertisements for Randall's beer in 1990. They were shown only in Jersey, but were later lampooned by Angus Deayton in his TV show Before They Were Famous.

Career
Hancock appeared in two episodes of Mr. Bean, first as a thief who stole Mr. Bean's camera, and later as a ticket inspector on a train. His early television credits also include Me, You and Him and The Mary Whitehouse Experience.

Hancock's comedy idol is Peter Cook and he got the chance to meet him when Cook appeared on Room 101. Hancock enjoyed hosting They Think It's All Over, especially when guests got in hot water: "Chris Eubank was slagging off Kiwi rugby star Jonah Lomu, who's 6 ft 5 in and about 18½ stone. I knew Jonah was backstage, about to come on for our 'feel the sportsman' round. It was a very pleasing moment!"

In 1998 Hancock starred (alongside Andy Smart) in a documentary/comedy about the Iranian national football team, "The Outsiders". In 1999 he also appeared in Great Railway Journeys of the World, travelling from Guantanamo to Pinar del Rio.

In 1998 Hancock also provided the narration for a six-part BBC documentary Pleasure Beach, following the running of the Blackpool amusement park.

After passing on the host's duties for both Room 101 and They Think It's All Over, Hancock took a sabbatical to spend more time with his family. He has made one-off appearances, including on Red Nose Day's The Ultimate Makeover, in which Hancock, Anna Ryder Richardson, Phil Tufnell and TV gardener Joe Swift transformed a Liverpool play centre for children whose parents could not afford child-care.

In 2006 Hancock appeared on TV Heaven, Telly Hell, discussing his TV likes and dislikes, with Trinny and Susannah being his number one hate.

Hancock filmed a series for STV and Discovery Real Time called Nick Hancock's Fishing School, where he teaches a number of students the art of fly fishing. The show, made by SMG Productions, began broadcasting in January 2007.

In 2007 he presented a new game show called Win My Wage for Channel 4. The show aired in Deal or No Deal'''s usual slot during the latter's summer break.

In 2007 it was announced that Hancock would host a new show on ITV1 in 2008 called Duel. The show was not recommissioned after its initial run.

In 2009 he became the host of a daytime cookery competition series, Taste the Nation, on ITV1.

In 2010 he stood in for Danny Baker and Colin Murray on the radio.

He appeared in a celebrity special edition of the ITV1 gameshow The Chase in 2011.

In 2011 he was asked by BBC America to join the panel of the NPR quiz show Wait Wait... Don't Tell Me! for a year-end special, "A Royal Pain in the News". Hancock won the game.

In 2012 he became the host of a new BBC Two show, Breakaway, which began on 12 March.

In June 2015 Hancock guest-hosted the breakfast show for Stoke-on-Trent radio station Signal 1.

In October 2021 he competed on Scott Mills and Chris Stark's "Upside Down Quiz" on their Weekend Show for BBC Radio 5. Hancock's podcast, "The Famous Sloping Pitch" is hosted on Apple.

In December 2022, Hancock's barn conversion home and contents, featured in S2/Ep4 of Celebrity Yorkshire Auction House, he submitted 15 quirky items to auction, including a club fender that made £400 and a retro lava lamp, which went for £30. In total,14 items sold, raising £1,123, the unsold item, a cherished oil painting, returned home with him.

Personal life
Hancock met his wife, Iranian-born Shari Eftekhari, during a George Best and Rodney Marsh football roadshow in Staines, Surrey. Hancock proposed to Shari in a pub: "We were playing pool in the Nellie Dean. I said to Shari: 'Have I got something stuck between my teeth?' As she looked I stuck out my tongue – there was an engagement ring on it. She said: 'That's lovely, yes, I will – but can we change the ring?" The couple married in Staffordshire in 1997, two years after they first met, and have two children.

Hancock is a lifelong supporter of Stoke City. In September 2001, he paid £20,000 at Sotheby's Football Memorabilia auction in London for the FA Cup winner's medal awarded to Sir Stanley Matthews in 1953. Hancock sold the medal in November 2014 for £220,000. In 2007, he made an appearance on an edition of Antiques Roadshow recorded in Stoke-on-Trent, talking about some of the items in his collection of football memorabilia. He is also an avid cricket fan. He was interviewed by 6 Towns Radio about the 40th anniversary of Stoke's 1972 League Cup win.

He lives with his wife and their two children in Shrewsbury.

Television creditsDamnedBostock's CupBreakawayDuelFantasy Football LeagueGreat Railway Journeys – CubaHancock's Half TimeHolding the BabyMACMe, You and HimMidsomer Murders  'Till death do us part'Mr. BeanNick Hancock's Fishing SchoolNightsPaul Merton: The SeriesPleasure Beach (Narrator)Punt and DennisRoom 101Swot or WotThe Danny Baker ShowThe Mary Whitehouse ExperienceThe Pall Bearer's Revue starring Jerry SadowitzThey Think It's All OverTV Heaven, Telly HellWait Wait... Don't Tell Me!Who's Doing the Dishes?Win, Lose or DrawWin My WageHancock recorded an hour-long compilation video release of footballing bloopers, dubbed Football Nightmares. This was released on VHS which was succeeded by two follow-up videos: Football Hell and Football Doctor. These three were later released on a one-disc DVD.

Radio creditsRoom 101Fish on FiveFighting TalkBack End of Next WeekWait Wait... Don't Tell Me!''

References

External links

1962 births
Living people
Alumni of Homerton College, Cambridge
English game show hosts
English male television actors
English radio personalities
English television presenters
People educated at Shrewsbury School
People from Stoke-on-Trent
Comedians from Staffordshire